The Briniates were an ancient Ligurian tribe mentioned by Livy as being subjugated by Rome under consuls Marcus Aemilius Lepidus and Quintus Mucius Scaevola in 175 BCE. They inhabited the valley of the Vara.

References

Ligures
Tribes conquered by the Roman Republic
Tribes conquered by Rome